Pizza with Shrimp on Top is a young adult play written by Aaron Levy.

Plot
Through the perspective of Stuart, a high school senior, Aaron Levy’s young adult play addresses teen struggles of self-worth, suicide, and communication between yourself and your loved ones. Stuart attempted suicide by overdose and is now trapped in the limbo between life and death. Yearnings deepen but can never be satisfied, and self-inflicted wounds never heal. Stuart meets Daniel, B.J., and Muggy, limbo’s "welcoming committee," and then runs into Lisa, an old crush from his school. When his little sister Stephanie visits him at the hospital, Stuart realizes that his time has run out, and he needs to make the choice between life and death. Genre: comedy, drama, fantasy.

Cast
 Stephanie—Stuart’s 13-year-old sister.
 Daniel—from the city, now in limbo
 Stuart—a senior in high school, our protagonist
 B.J.—also from the city, now in limbo, dim-witted
 Lisa—a senior in high school, the ex-prom queen
 Muggy—formerly of the British military, now in limbo

Awards
1992: Scottie Award for Best Original Play at Arizona State University.

1999: Nevada Council of the Arts special grant in education, Las Vegas, Nevada

2006: Distinguished Play Award in the category of middle school and secondary school audience plays presented by The American Alliance Theatre in Education

2008: Georgia Author of the Year Nominee in the young adult category, Georgia Writer's Association.

Publications
Published 17 October 2006 by Dramatic Publishing.

Productions and staged readings

Aaron Levy often participates in the staged readings of his play. He reads the part of Daniel.

1991—Director's Studio Arizona State University (staged reading)

1992—Arcadia High School

1992—Horizon School

1992—Chandler High School

1992—Central High School

1992—Coronado High School

1995—Ethnic Cultural Theatre, Seattle, Washington

1997--Notre Dame University

1999—Northern Indiana Regional Thespian Conference

1996—Basic High School

1999—Green Valley High School

1999—Charleston Center for the Arts, Las Vegas, Nevada

1998 – 1999—Silverado High School

2000—Indian Springs High School

2000—Sunset High School

2000—Hamilton High School

2000—International Thespian Society Selection at South Mountain High School

2001—University of Reno

2006—Woodland High School, GA

2006–2007—Kennesaw State University

March 2007—Tisdale Mid/Secondary School, Tisdale, SK CANADA

August 2007—Sprayberry High School, GA for Cobb Co. English Teachers In-Service (staged reading)

November 2008—American Hebrew Academy, Greensboro, NC

November 2008—Momence High School, Momence, IL

June 2009—Russellville High School, Russellville, AR

January 2009—Russellville High School, Russellville, AR

October 2009—Hiram High School, Hiram, GA

November 2009—Sacred Heart Prep, Atherton, CA

January 2010—Revelstoke Theatre Company, Revelstoke, BC

March 2010--Rogue Valley Medical Center, Medford, OR.

March 2014-Maricopa Community Theatre, Maricopa, AZ

References

External links
 StagePlays.com Pizza with Shrimp on Top
 Dramatic Publishing
 Pizza with Shrimp on Top Staged Reading Youtube Video
 Google Books Pizza with Shrimp on Top
 Aaron Levy Résumé

1991 plays
Limbo
Fiction about suicide
Fiction about the afterlife